The Young Vic Theatre is a performing arts venue located on The Cut, near the South Bank, in the London Borough of Lambeth.

The Young Vic was established by Frank Dunlop in 1970. Kwame Kwei-Armah has been Artistic Director since February 2018, succeeding David Lan.

History

In the period after World War II, a Young Vic Company was formed in 1946 by director George Devine as an offshoot of the Old Vic Theatre School for the purpose of performing classic plays for audiences aged nine to fifteen.

This was discontinued in 1948 when Devine and the entire faculty resigned from the Old Vic, but in 1969 Frank Dunlop became founder-director of The Young Vic theatre with Scapino, his free adaptation of Molière's The Cheats of Scapin, presented at the new venue as a National Theatre production, opening on 11 September 1970 and starring Jim Dale in the title role with designs by Carl Toms (decor) and Maria Björnson (costumes).

Initially part of the National Theatre, the Young Vic Theatre became an independent body in 1974.

In the words of Laurence Olivier, then director of the National Theatre: "Here we think to develop plays for young audiences, an experimental workshop for authors, actors and producers." The aim was to create an accessible theatre which offered high quality at low cost in an informal environment. The aim was to appeal to young audiences, but this time not specifically to children.

Young Vic Theatre

Frank Dunlop completed creation of the theatre venue in 1970, a breeze-block building on The Cut constructed out of a former butcher's shop and an adjacent bomb-site with bold gloss red wooden slat auditorium bench seating. The structure was intended to last for five years, but has become permanent.

The auditorium, with a thrust stage, has an approximate capacity of 420, although the configuration and capacity can vary depending on the design of each production.

The Theatre undertook a significant rebuilding and renewal project in the 2000s, designed by architects Haworth Tompkins, boosting its visibility on The Cut. In addition to the Young Vic's main house, there are now two smaller theatre spaces. The Maria, named after theatre designer Maria Björnson, is the larger of the two with a capacity of 150. The Clare, named after a former artistic director of the Young Vic and Sheffield Crucible, Clare Venables, seats 70. Like the main house, both smaller theatres have flexible seating configurations which can be arranged to suit the production design. In the two smaller auditoria seating is usually unreserved, with the actors performing in close proximity to the audience.

The Young Vic performs both new writing and classic plays, the latter often in innovative productions. Despite its small size, like the Almeida Theatre, the Young Vic attracts well-known actors since its creation. These have included Ian Charleson, who made his memorable professional debut with the Young Vic 1972–74, and who played Jimmy Porter in Look Back in Anger and Hamlet in the first revival of Stoppard's Rosencrantz and Guildenstern Are Dead in 1973,Vanessa Redgrave, Helen Mirren, Judi Dench, Timothy Dalton, Robert Lindsay, Willard White, John Malkovich, Michael Sheen and Arthur Lowe.

Quintessential rock band The Who held free, weekly concerts at the Young Vic in early 1971 in order to rehearse what would become their masterpiece album, Who's Next. One of these shows was released on the Deluxe edition of this album.

A memorial at the theatre's south-east corner commemorates the 54 people killed in 1941 while sheltering in the cellars of the former building on the site, during the Blitz.

In 1982 the theatre hosted a  Poetry Olympics, where comedian Pat Condell took part. Virginia Woolf taught at Morley College from 1905, which represented the natural precursor of the Young Vic's education and community engagement programme. The latter now runs an office which accommodates and paradoxically houses the 'homeless' Belarus Free Theatre, of Nikolai Khalezin, Natalia Koliada, inspiring a new feminist generation and aesthetic, with Sarah Kane's '4.48 Psychosis' performed underground, illegally in Minsk and Farringdon, in the cold cells of Clerkenwell House of Detention, a secret location in London. Echoing the words of Woolf and mirroring her suicide, Kane's play benefitted from another feminist, Sue Emmas, who since the year 1993 has been Associate Director of the social engagement programme, working closely with Kwame Kwei-Armah and leads the Directors Program which provides initiatives for emerging directors, with emphasis on seeking out and nurturing artists from under-represented backgrounds.

Artistic Directors 
 Frank Dunlop (1968–1971, also Administrative Director) 
 Michael Bogdanov (1971–1973)
 David Thacker
 Julia Bardsley and Tim Supple (jointly)  (1991–1994)
 Tim Supple (1994–2000)
 David Lan (2000–2018)
 Kwame Kwei-Armah (2018–present)

Awards
 2004 – Laurence Olivier Award for Outstanding Achievement in an Affiliate Theatre 
 2008 – Laurence Olivier Award for Best Musical Revival Laurence Olivier Award for Outstanding Achievement in an Affiliate Theatre 
 2013 – The Critics' Circle Peter Hepple Award for Best Musical: The Scottsboro Boys 
 2016 – Laurence Olivier Award for Best Revival: Yerma  
 2018 – The Critics' Circle Award for Best New Play: The Inheritance  
 2018 – Evening Standard Theatre Award for Best New Play: The Inheritance  
 2019 – Screen Nation Film and TV Awards Diversity in Drama Award: Soon Gone: A Windrush Chronicle  
 2019 – Laurence Olivier Award for Best New Play: The Inheritance

Refurbishment 2004–2006 
In 2003, the Young Vic launched a campaign to raise £12.5 million for a major reconstruction of its building and closed in 2004 for work to start.

Designed by architects Haworth Tompkins – also known for their refurbishment of the Royal Court Theatre, Regent's Park Open Air Theatre, and two temporary venues for the Almeida – and with Jane Wernick Associates as the structural engineers, and consulting engineers Max Fordham LLP designing the building services, the refurbishment was completed in October 2006.

The main auditorium has been left intact, but refurbished and technically enhanced. The butcher's shop has also been retained as the main entrance to the building and also the box office.

The remainder of the 1970s structure has been rebuilt to provide new foyers, dressing rooms, two studio theatres, and workshop spaces. An award of £5 million was received from the Arts Council of England.

The Young Vic re-opened on 11 October 2006, with a production of the community opera Tobias and the Angel; with music by Jonathan Dove and a libretto by David Lan.

On 16 May 2007, the refurbished Young Vic won the RIBA London Building of the Year Award. Following this award, the Young Vic was also shortlisted for the RIBA Stirling Prize on 27 July 2007.

A rebranding exercise by Sense Worldwide in 2010 resulted in the abandonment of its 30-year-old "sit anywhere" policy and a new strapline, "It's a big world in here".

Notable productions

March 2023 - March 2024 

 Further than the Furthest Thing by Zinnie Harris, directed by Jennifer Tang
 untitled f*ck m*ss s**gon play by Kimber Lee, directed by Roy Alexander Weise

February 2022 - February 2023 

 The Collaboration by Anthony McCarten, directed by Kwame Kwei-Armah, starring Jeremy Pope and Paul Bettany
 Oklahoma! by Rodgers and Hammerstein, directed by Daniel Fish, starring Arthur Darvill, Anoushka Lucas and Marisha Wallace
 Chasing Hares by Sonali Bhattacharyya, directed by Milli Bhatia
 Who Killed My Father by Ivo Van Hove from the book by Édouard Louis, directed by Ivo Van Hove, starring Hans Kesting
 Mandela by Greg Dean Borowsky, Shaun Borowsky and Laiona Michelle, directed by Schele Williams

July 2021 - February 2022 

 Chasing Destiny by Ben Okri, directed by Kwame Kwei-Armah
 Klippies by Jessica Siân, directed by Diyan Zora
 AI, created and directed by Jennifer Tang and Company
 Hamlet by William Shakespeare, directed by Greg Hersov, starring Cush Jumbo
 Best of Enemies by James Graham, directed by Jeremy Herrin, starring David Harewood and Charles Edwards
 Conundrum by Paul Anthony Morris, starring Anthony Ofoegbu

February 2019 – March 2020 

 Jesus Hopped the 'A' Train by Stephen Adly Guirgis. Directed by Kate Hewitt
 Death of a Salesman by Arthur Miller. Directed by Marianne Elliott and Miranda Cromwell
 American Dream 2.0
 Ivan and the Dogs by Hattie Naylor. Directed by Caitriona Shoobridge.
 Bronx Gothic by Okwui Okpokwasili and Peter Born
 Tree Created by Idris Elba and Kwame Kwei-Armah
 Blood Wedding by Federico García Lorca in a new version by Marina Carr. Directed by Yael Farber.
Fairview by Jackie Sibblies Drury. Direction by Nadia Latif,

March 2018 – February 2019 

 The Convert by Danai Gurira. Directed by Ola Ince. 
 Twelfth Night by William Shakespeare. Conceived by Kwame Kwei-Armah and Shaina Taub. Music and Lyrics by Shaina Taub. Directed by Kwame Kwei-Armah and Oskar Eustis

March 2014 – February 2015
 Oh My Sweet Land A Young Vic / Théâtre de Vidy-Lausanne co-production. Direction Amir Nizar Zuabi.
 A View from the Bridge by Arthur Miller. Direction Ivo Van Hove.
 Safe House An installation by Jeremy Herbert and Gabriella Sonabend.
 Red Forest Devised and performed by Belarus Free Theatre.
 The Valley of Astonishment Direction Peter Brook and Marie-Hélène Estienne.
 The Events An Actors Touring Company, Young Vic, Brageteatret & Schauspielhaus Wien Co-Production. Direction Ramin Gray.
 A Streetcar Named Desire by Tennessee Williams. Direction Benedict Andrews.
 My Perfect Mind created by Told by an Idiot written by Kathryn Hunter, Paul Hunter and Edward Petherbridge. Direction Kathryn Hunter.
 The Cherry Orchard by Anton Chekhov. Direction Katie Mitchell.
 A Harlem Dream by Ivan Blackstock.
 Dusk A Fevered Sleep / Young Vic co-production. Directed and devised by David Harradine & Samantha Butler.
 Golem created by 1927. Directed and written by Suzanne Andrade.
 The Way Back Home An ENO and Young Vic co-production, based on the book by Oliver Jeffers. Directed by Katie Mitchell.
 Happy Days by Samuel Beckett. Directed by Natalie Abrahami.

March 2012 – February 2014
 After Miss Julie A version of Strindberg's 'Miss Julie' by Patrick Marber. Direction Natalie Abrahami.
 Minsk A Reply to Kathy Acker. Presented by Fuel, Belarus Free Theatre and LIFT 2012. Directed and adapted by Vladimir Shcherban.
 Mad About the Boy A new play by Gbolahan Obisesan. An Iron Shoes production in association with the Unicorn. Direction Ria Parry.
 The Suit After Can Themba, Mothobi Mutloatse & Barney Simon. Adaptation, direction & music by Peter Brook, Marie-Hélène Estienne & Franck Krawczyk.
 Three Sisters by Anton Chekhov. A new version by Benedict Andrews. Direction Benedict Andrews.
 Theatre Uncut 2012 Top international playwrights respond to world events.
 The Changeling by Thomas Middleton & William Rowley. Direction Joe Hill-Gibbins.
 The Shawl by David Mamet. Direction Ben Kidd.
 Going Dark Written by Hattie Naylor in collaboration with Sound&Fury. Direction Mark Espiner & Dan Jones.
 Feast Direction Rufus Norris.
 Above Me the Wide Blue Sky Created by Fevered Sleep. Direction and Design David Harradine & Sam Butler.
 Public Enemy By Henrik Ibsen. Direction Richard Jones.
 Trash Cuisine Devised and performed by Belarus Free Theatre.
 Brilliant Created by Fevered Sleep. Direction and Design David Harradine & Sam Butler.
 A Season in the Congo by Aime Cesaire. Direction Joe Wright.
 A Doll's House by Henrik Ibsen. English-language version by Simon Stephens. Direction Carrie Cracknell.
 Sizwe Banzi is Dead Devised by Athol Fugard, John Kani & Winston Ntshona. Direction Matthew Xia.
 Theatre Uncut 2013 Top international playwrights respond to world events.
 The Island Devised by Athol Fugard, John Kani & Winston Ntshona. Direction Alex Brown.
 The Events An Actors Touring Company, Young Vic, Brageteatret & Schauspielhaus Wien Co-Production. Direction Ramin Gray.
 Beauty and the Beast ONEOFUS present Beauty and the Beast in co-production with Improbable. Direction Phelim McDermott.
 The Scottsboro Boys Music & Lyrics by John Kander and Fred Ebb. Book by David Thompson. Direction & Choreography by Susan Stroman. A Catherine Schreiber & Young Vic Production.
 Brand New Ancients Kae Tempest and Battersea Arts Centre on Tour.
 Happy Days by Samuel Beckett. Direction Natalie Abrahami.
 Sizwe Banzi is Dead Devised by Athol Fugard, John Kani & Winston Ntshona. Direction Matthew Xia.

January 2011 – February 2012
 Vernon God Little Book by DBC Pierre. Adaptation Tanya Ronder. Direction Rufus Norris. With Luke Brady, Clare Burt, Daniel Cerqueira, Peter De Jersey, Joseph Drake, Johnnie Fiori, Lily James, Penny Layden, Nathan Osgood and Duncan Wisbey.
 And the Rain Falls Down by Fevered Sleep. Direction Sam Butler. Direction & Design David Harradine.
 Terminus by Mark O'Rowe. Direction Mark O'Rowe. With Declan Conlon, Olwen Fouere and Catherine Walker.
 The Return of Ulysses by Monteverdi. An ENO/Young Vic Theatre co-production. Direction Benedict Andrews.
 I Am the Wind by Jon Fosse. English-language version by Simon Stephens. Direction Patrice Chéreau and Thierry Theiu Niang. With Tom Brooke and Jack Laskey.
 Government Inspector by Nikolai Gogol in a new version by David Harrower. Direction Richard Jones. With Julian Barratt, Doon Mackichan and Kyle Soller.
 In the Penal Colony by Franz Kafka. Adapted by Amir Nizar Zuabi. Presented by ShiberHur Theatre Company of Palestine.
 The Beauty Queen of Leenane by Martin McDonagh. Direction Joe Hill-Gibbins. With Rosaleen Linehan and Derbhle Crotty.
 Disco Pigs by Enda Walsh. Direction Cathal Cleary.
 Street Scene with The Opera Group. Music by Kurt Weill. Book by Elmer Rice. Lyrics by Langston Hughes. Music performed by the BBC Concert Orchestra and Southbank Sinfonia.
 One for the Road/Victoria Station by Harold Pinter. Direction Jeff James.
 Hamlet by William Shakespeare. Direction Ian Rickson. The role of Hamlet performed by Michael Sheen.
Orpheus in the Underworld in a new translation by Rory Bremner. A Scottish Opera and Northern Ireland Opera co-production
 Bingo by Edward Bond. Direction Angus Jackson. The role of Shakespeare performed by Patrick Stewart.
 Wild Swans by Jung Chang and adapted by Alexandra Wood. Directed by Sacha Wares.

September 2010 – January 2011
 The Human Comedy with The Opera Group. Music by Galt MacDermot. Book by William Dumaresq. From an original story by William Saroyan. Direction by John Fulljames. With Brenda Edwards.
 On Ageing by Fevered Sleep. Direction and Design David Harradine and Sam Butler.
 Faust adapted from Goethe by Vesturport. Direction Gisli Orn Gardarsson. Music by Nick Cave & Warren Ellis.
 The Glass Menagerie by Tennessee Williams. Direction Joe Hill-Gibbins. Music by Dario Marianelli. With Leo Bill, Deborah Findlay, Sinéad Matthews and Kyle Soller.
 Belarus Free Theatre: Numbers / Discover Love. Guest appearances from Adjoa Andoh, Jude Law, Ian McKellen, Sienna Miller and Samuel West.
 My Dad's a Birdman. By David Almond. Music by Pet Shop Boys. Direction Oliver Mears.

October 2009 – January 2010
 Annie Get Your Gun. Music & lyrics by Irving Berlin. Book by Herbert & Dorothy Fields. Direction Richard Jones. With Jane Horrocks and Julian Ovenden.

May 2009 – August 2010
 Sweet Nothings based on Arthur Schnitzler's Liebelei from 1895, arranged by David Harrower, directed by Luc Bondy
 Where's Ali devised by Ned Glasier. 
 Pictures from an Exhibition based on the suite by Modest Mussorgsky. Direction Daniel Kramer. Choreography Frauke Requardt.
 Kursk by Sound&Fury, in collaboration with Bryony Lavery.
 Been So Long Book, lyrics and direction Ché Walker. Music and lyrics Arthur Darvill.
 Sus by Barrie Keefe. Direction Gbolahan Obisesan.
 Brilliant by Fevered Sleep. Direction David Harradine.
 The Container by Clare Bayley. Direction Tom Wright. Design Naomi Dawson.
 4.48 Psychosis by Sarah Kane. Direction Christian Benedetti. With Anamaria Marinca.
 The Girlfriend Experience by Alecky Blythe. Direction Joe Hill-Gibbins.

January 2009 – April 2009
 King Lear by William Shakespeare. Direction Rupert Goold. With Pete Postlethwaite as King Lear.
 The Indian Wants the Bronx by Israel Horovitz. Direction Daljinder Singh. Design Paul Wills.
 Kafka's Monkey Based on A Report to an Academy by Franz Kafka. Adaptation Colin Teevan. Direction Walter Meierjohann. With Kathryn Hunter.
 Bay devised by the company with writer Joel Horwood. Direction Sarah Tipple.
 After Dido Purcell's Dido and Aeneas in a new film and theatre piece. Direction Katie Mitchell.
 You Can See the Hills written and directed by Matthew Dunster. With William Ash.

July 2008 – January 2009
 Street Scene. Music by Kurt Weill. Book by Edgar Rice. Lyrics by Langston Hughes.
 Fragments by Samuel Beckett. Direction Peter Brook.
 In the Red and Brown Water by Tarell Alvin McCraney (part of the Brother/Sister plays). Direction Walter Meierjohann. Design Miriam Buether.
 The Brothers Size by Tarell Alvin McCraney (part of the Brother/Sister plays). Direction Bijan Sheibani. Design Patrick Burnier.
 You Can See the Hills by Matthew Dunster. Direction Matthew Dunster. Designer Anna Fleischle.
 Amazônia by Colin Teevan and Paul Heritage. Direction Paul Heritage. Designer Gringo Cardia.
 Ghosts by Henrik Ibsen, adaptation Frank McGuiness. Direction William Oldroyd.

January 2008 – June 2008
 A Prayer for My Daughter (play) by Thomas Babe. Direction Dominic Hill. Design Giles Cadle. Lighting Bruno Poet.
 The Good Soul of Szechuan by Bertolt Brecht. Translation David Harrower. Direction Richard Jones. Set Miriam Buether. Costume Nicky Gillibrand.

June 2007 – January 2008
 Ma vie en rose based on the film by Alain Berliner. Direction Pete Harris. Music Gary Yershon. Choreography Ayse Tashkiran.
 The Member of the Wedding by Carson McCullers. Direction Matthew Dunster. Design Robert Innes Hopkins.
 Fragments by Samuel Beckett. Direction Peter Brook.
 The Investigation by Peter Weiss, adapted by Jean Baudrillard. Direction Dorcy Rugamba and Isabelle Gyselinx. Design Fabienne Damiean.
 The Brothers Size  by Tarell Alvin McCraney (part of the Brother/Sister plays). Direction Bijan Sheibani. Design Patrick Burnier.
 A Christmas Carol, by Charles Dickens, adapted and directed by Mark Dornford-May
 The Magic Flute  by Mozart, adapted and directed by Mark Dornford-May

October 2006 – June 2007
 Tobias and the Angel  – Music by Jonathan Dove. Words by David Lan. Direction John Fulljames. Conductor David Charles Abell. Design Alexander Lowde.
 Love and Money  – by Dennis Kelly. Direction Matthew Dunster. Design Anna Fleischle.
 The Enchanted Pig  – Music by Jonathan Dove. Words by Alasdair Middleton. Direction John Fulljames. Design Dick Bird.
 The Soldiers Fortune  – by Thomas Otway. Direction David Lan. Set Lizzie Clachan. Costumes Joan Wadge.
 generations  – by debbie tucker green. Direction Sacha Wares. Design Miriam Buether.
 A Respectable Wedding – by Bertolt Brecht. Translation Rory Bremner. Direction Joe Hill-Gibbins. Design Ultz.
 The Jewish Wife  – by Bertolt Brecht. Translation Martin Crimp. Direction Katie Mitchell. Design Hildegard Bechtler.
 Senora Carrar's Rifles  – by Bertolt Brecht. Translation Biyi Bandele. Direction Paul Hunter. Design Robert Innes Hopkins.
 How Much Is Your Iron?  – by Bertolt Brecht. Translation Enda Walsh. Direction Orla O'Loughlin. Design Dick Bird.
 Vernon God Little  – by DBC Pierre. Adaptation Tanya Ronder. Direction Rufus Norris. Design Ian MacNeil. Costumes Nicky Gillibrand.

 Digital Theatre 
The Young Vic was one of the launch theatres for Digital Theatre, a project that makes theatre productions available in video download form. The first performances that were filmed were Kafka's Monkey and The Container''.

References 

Buildings and structures completed in 1970
Theatres in the London Borough of Lambeth
Producing house theatres in London
1970 establishments in England